Keni Fisilau is a retired Tongan rugby union player. He played a majority of his career for the English club Plymouth Albion Rugby Football Club in the RFU Championship. Fisilau made his debut for Tonga in 1999 against Japan. He last played for Tonga against Italy in 2005.

References

External links
Plymouth Albion Profile
ESPN Scrum Profile

1976 births
Living people
Plymouth Albion R.F.C. players
Tonga international rugby union players
Tongan rugby union players
Tongan expatriate rugby union players
Expatriate rugby union players in England
Tongan expatriate sportspeople in England
Rugby union centres